This is a list of universities in Tokelau.

Universities 
 University of the South Pacific (Tokelau campus)

See also 
 List of universities by country

References

Universities
Tokelau
Tokelau

Universities